Donald John Cockell (22 September 1928 – 18 July 1983) was an English boxer. He fought for most of his career as a light-heavyweight and became the British and European champion at that weight. Later in his career he moved up to heavyweight and held the British and Commonwealth heavyweight titles. He is best remembered for fighting against Rocky Marciano for the world heavyweight championship. Cockell defeated a number of top heavyweights in his career, including Roland La Starza, Harry Matthews (three times), Tommy Farr, Freddie Beshore, Johnny Arthur, Johnny Williams and Uber Bacilieri. In his earlier incarnation as a Light Heavyweight he defeated top contenders such as Nick Barone, Albert Yvel, Lloyd Marshall and Albert Finch, holding regional titles in both weight incarnations.

Early life
His full name was Donald John Cockell and he was born on 22 September 1928 in Balham, London, the son of Mary Cockell, a domestic servant from Battersea. He never knew his father. He was a blacksmith by trade, and as a result developed a strong physique. He began boxing in fairground booths and soon rose through the amateur ranks until he was ready to turn professional in 1946.

Professional career
Cockell had his first professional fight on 26 June 1946 against Trevor Lowder and won it by a knockout in the fifth round. He continued to build up an impressive fighting record marred by the occasional defeat. By 1950 he was ready to challenge for the vacant British light-heavyweight title recently vacated due to the retirement of Freddie Mills. On 17 October at Harringay Arena he fought Mark Hart and took the title with a knockout in the fourteenth round.

Cockell fought and won two more fights before fighting the Frenchman Albert Yvel for his European light-heavyweight title. The bout took place on 27 March 1951 at Earls Court, London and Cockell won by a technical knockout in the sixth round.

Cockell had two more wins before defending his British and European titles against Albert Finch, who had previously been British middleweight champion. The bout was held on 16 October 1951, at Harringay Arena, and Cockell won by a knockout in the seventh round.

Cockell decisively lost his next fight against the American heavyweight Jimmy Slade. Fighting at Harringay Arena, Cockell was knocked down twice in the first round, once in the second, and twice more in the fourth. The referee then stopped the fight. Cockell followed this defeat with a points win against Italian light-heavyweight Renato Tontini, despite being knocked down twice in the second round.

Cockell then fought against Randolph Turpin, who the year before, had become one of the few to defeat Sugar Ray Robinson, becoming world middleweight champion as a result before losing his title in the rematch. Cockell was defending his British title, and both fighters were contesting the vacant Commonwealth light-heavyweight title. The bout was at the White City Stadium on 10 June 1952. Cockell was knocked down three times during the fight and lost on a technical knockout in the eleventh round. One of the reasons for the defeat was the difficulty that Cockell had in making the weight for light-heavyweight fights. He therefore decided to fight subsequently as a heavyweight.

Up in weight 
His next three fights, at heavyweight, were all won by technical knockouts. The third one was against the Welshman, Tommy Farr, who had been an excellent heavyweight, fighting against the great Joe Louis, but who was now at the end of his career, and had aged quite a bit.

The fight against Farr was a final eliminator for the British heavyweight title, and so put Cockell in line for a title challenge against the holder Johnny Williams. The bout for the British and Commonwealth titles was held at Harringay Arena on 12 May 1953, and Cockell won on points over fifteen rounds.

Cockell then had two more wins before defending his Commonwealth title against Johnny Arthur in Johannesburg, South Africa. He won the fight on points after fifteen rounds.

Cockell moved rapidly up the heavyweight rankings by scoring three wins against American fighters. First he beat Roland La Starza on points at Earls Court Arena, then he had successive victories over Harry (Kid) Matthews, first at the White City Stadium and then at Sicks' Stadium, Seattle.

These victories put him in line for a title fight against undefeated heavyweight world champion Rocky Marciano. This was the first British world title bid since Tommy Farr had fought Joe Louis in 1937.

World heavyweight title fight
On 16 May 1955, Cockell fought Marciano for the world heavyweight title at Kezar Stadium in San Francisco, CA. Cockell was a 10–1 underdog and weighed 14 st 9 lbs against Marciano's 13 st 7 lbs, coming into the fight weighing 205 pounds to Rocky's 189. For the first three rounds the fight was fairly even, but as it progressed further Cockell began to take more and more punishment, without being able to hurt Marciano much. Cockell ended the eighth round hanging through the ropes after withstanding a terrific beating. Marciano won the fight by a technical knockout 54 seconds into round nine after Cockell had been knocked down twice, for counts of eight and seven. After the fight, Marciano stated, "He's got a lot of guts. I don't think I ever hit anyone else any more often or harder."

Many boxing fans in Britain felt that Marciano employed unfair tactics, such as hitting after the bell and low punches, but although the British Boxing Board of Control protested, Cockell himself made no complaints.

In covering the fight for Sports Illustrated, Budd Schulberg wrote in the 30 May 1955 edition, "Except for the technicality of wearing eight-ounce gloves, Don Cockell's stand against Rocky Marciano in the fading daylight hours of a cool San Francisco sunlit day was a glorious—or appalling—throwback to this pre-Marquess of Queensberry condition. This was a bare-knuckle brawl with gloves—and not a pleasant sight either—as an uncouth, merciless, uncontrolled and truly vicious fighter (the unbeaten Champion Marciano) wore down an ox-legged, resolute fat man who came into the ring with the honor of the British Empire weighing heavily—and consciously—on his massive, blubbery shoulders. He had promised his Union Jack supporters that he would not let them down, and the first words he mumbled through swollen lips after his fearful beating in nine rounds were an apology to his fellow countrymen for not having done better."

Jack Gallagher of the Oakland Tribune praised Cockell's brave effort, writing, "The fight was all Rocky's from the beginning.  The Englishman showed amazing capacity for soaking up punishment."

Aftermath
The title fight had taken much out of Cockell, and he lost his subsequent two fights. In September 1955 he lost to the Cuban contender Nino Valdes at the White City Stadium by a technical knockout in the third round. He weighed 15 st 6 lbs for the fight. In April 1956 he was knocked out in the second round by Kitione Lave, known as the "Tongan Terror". That was his final fight. In May 1956 he was stripped of his Commonwealth title and in July he surrendered his British title and declared his retirement.

Cockell sued the Daily Mail after the newspaper had described him as being 'overweight and flabby' for his last fight, and not giving his all. He received £7,500 damages with costs.

Fight record
He had 81 official fights, winning 66, of which 38 were by knockouts, and lost 14, with one drawn fight.

Retirement
He tried various jobs including running a farm, being a publican, and running a haulage firm based at Ninfield in East Sussex. By 1975 he was working as a craftsman blacksmith in the permanent way machine shops at the London Underground Lillie Bridge Depot in Fulham. His last job was as an emergency maintenance man. He died of cancer on 18 July 1983 at a hospital in Tooting. He was married to Patricia Mary Cockell and had a son Patrick and
Brother (David Hammond) worked with him

Footnotes

See also
 List of British heavyweight boxing champions
 List of British light-heavyweight boxing champions

Sources

Biography, Oxford Dictionary of National Biography

English male boxers
Heavyweight boxers
Light-heavyweight boxers
1928 births
1983 deaths
People from Balham
English blacksmiths
Boxers from Greater London